Lake Arthur is a lake in Polk County, near the town of Fertile in the U.S. state of Minnesota.

Lake Arthur was named for Chester A. Arthur (1829–1886), American politician and 21st President of the United States.

See also
List of lakes in Minnesota

References

Lakes of Minnesota
Lakes of Polk County, Minnesota